This list of American films of 1936 compiles American feature-length motion pictures that were released in 1936.
The Great Ziegfeld won Best Picture at the Academy Awards.

A

B

C

D

E

F

G

H

I

J

K

L

M

N

O

P

R

S

T

U

V

W

Y

Note
Although it was released at the end of 1935 and appears on the List of American films of 1935, A Tale in Two Cities was one of ten films competing for the Academy Award for Best Picture of 1936 at the 9th Academy Awards on March 4, 1937.

See also
 1936 in the United States

References

External links

1936 films at the Internet Movie Database

1936
Films
Lists of 1936 films by country or language